Brandon Paul League (born March 16, 1983) is an American former professional baseball pitcher. League has played in Major League Baseball (MLB) for the Toronto Blue Jays, Seattle Mariners, and Los Angeles Dodgers. He is a former closer and one-time All-Star.

Professional career

Toronto Blue Jays
He was drafted by the Toronto Blue Jays in the second round of the 2001 MLB Draft out of Saint Louis School, and was signed on July 3, 2001. He made his major league debut on September 21, 2004 against the New York Yankees as he pitched a solid inning and a third.

Following League's breakout season in 2006, he engaged in strength conditioning during the offseason, and at the behest of the Blue Jays, did not pitch until spring training. As a result, he overdeveloped some shoulder muscles, resulting in a significant drop in his fastball velocity. League was placed on the 60-day disabled list and missed the majority of the 2007 season. Both his velocity and effectiveness recovered the following season.

Seattle Mariners
On December 22, 2009, League was traded to the Seattle Mariners along with minor-league outfielder Johermyn Chávez for pitcher Brandon Morrow. He signed a one-year, $1.08 million contract for 2010. Because of an injury to David Aardsma, League started the 2011 season as the Mariners' closer. He was selected to his first All-Star game as a relief pitcher for the 2011 All-Star game. In a 2011 interview, veteran outfielder Coco Crisp named League as one of the four toughest pitchers he had ever faced. On June 8, 2012, League was one of six Mariners to throw a combined no-hitter against the Los Angeles Dodgers at Safeco Field. After a series of blown saves, League was replaced by Tom Wilhelmsen as closer. In 2 seasons with the Mariners, League had converted a total of 52 saves in 69 chances with a 3.26 ERA.

Los Angeles Dodgers

On July 30, 2012, League was traded to the Los Angeles Dodgers for minor leaguers Leon Landry and Logan Bawcom. He became the Dodgers closer in September after Kenley Jansen was sidelined with an irregular heartbeat. In 28 games with the Dodgers, he was 2-1 with a 2.30 ERA and six saves. On October 30, the Dodgers re-signed League to a three-year, $22.5 million deal with a vesting option worth $7.5 million for 2016. On June 11, League was demoted from the closer role after blowing his fourth save in 17 chances, and he was replaced by Jansen. He was used primarily in low pressure situations the rest of the season. Overall, in 2013, he was 6-4 with a 5.30 ERA in 58 appearances, with 14 early season saves. In 2014, the Dodgers used League primarily in middle relief. He finished the season with a 2–3 record and a 2.57 ERA in 63 games.

League underwent an MRI during spring training in 2015 which revealed serious shoulder damage, causing him to miss the first couple months of the season. After spending a month rehabbing in the minors, League was designated for assignment on July 2, 2015. He was released on July 10.

Kansas City Royals
League did not play professional baseball at any level in 2016. On January 7, 2017, League signed a minor league contract with the Kansas City Royals that included an invitation to spring training. He was released on March 19, 2017.

New Britain Bees
After he was released by the Royals, League signed with the New Britain Bees of the independent Atlantic League of Professional Baseball. He became a free agent after the 2017 season.

Pitching style
League's main pitch is a very hard sinker averaging 96 mph. (In 2011, he had the hardest sinker of any relief pitcher, at 97.3 mph.) He also has an upper-80s slider that he uses primarily early in the count to right-handed hitters. He also has a splitter that he uses as a strikeout pitch. The splitter has a whiff rate of 55%.

Personal life
League resides in Honolulu, and is hapa Yonsei. His maternal great-grandparents were born and raised in Fukuoka prefecture on Kyushu Island in Japan.

League's wife, Sasha League, attended Mt. Carmel High School in San Diego, California. She holds a psychology major from the University of Hawaii. They have been married since 2005. Brandon and Sasha League are parents to four girls.

After his playing career, League founded Parallel X League, a Southern California-based clothing line, in 2019.

References

External links

1983 births
American baseball players of Japanese descent
American expatriate baseball players in Canada
American League All-Stars
Auburn Doubledays players
Baseball players from Sacramento, California
Baseball players from Honolulu
Charleston AlleyCats players
Dunedin Blue Jays players
Gulf Coast Blue Jays players
Living people
Los Angeles Dodgers players
Major League Baseball pitchers
Medicine Hat Blue Jays players
New Britain Bees players
New Hampshire Fisher Cats players
Oklahoma City Dodgers players
Rancho Cucamonga Quakes players
Saint Louis School alumni
Seattle Mariners players
Syracuse Chiefs players
Syracuse SkyChiefs players
Toronto Blue Jays players